Ishmael Bernal (September 30, 1938 – June 2, 1996) was a Filipino filmmaker, stage and television director, actor and screenwriter. Noted for his melodramas, particularly with feminist and moral issues, he directed many landmark Filipino films such as Nunal sa Tubig (1976), City After Dark (1980), Relasyon (1982), Himala (1982), and Hinugot sa Langit (1985). He was declared a National Artist of the Philippines in 2001.

Biography
Born in Manila on September 30, 1938, Bernal was the son of Elena Bernal and Pacifico Ledesma.
He studied at Burgos Elementary School, Mapa High School and at the University of the Philippines where he finished his Bachelor of Arts degree in English in 1959. After graduation he worked with Lamberto Avellana's documentary outfit before proceeding to France where he earned his Licentiate in French Literature and Philosophy at the University of Aix-en-Provence. He received his Diploma in Film Directing in 1970 at the Film Institute of India in Poona under the Colombo plan scholarship. An active participant in the struggle for artists' rights and welfare, Bernal was also a board member of the Concerned Artists of the Philippines and the Directors Guild of the Philippines, Inc. Until his demise, he remained part of DGPI. This organization studies the role of film as an instrument of entertainment, education, and development.

As an artist
Ishmael Bernal truly loved the arts. He nurtured his passion for literature and theater by actively participating in the U.P. Dramatic Club while finishing a college degree. He was also an avid fan of classical music including opera. During the 1960s, Bernal put up When It's a Grey November in Your Soul, in Malate which became one of the favorite watering holes of Manila's artists and intellectuals. Unfazed by its short-lived success, Bernal put up Kasalo in Quezon City three decades later, which became the hang-out of students, journalists, poets, bands, theater and film artists.

As a film director
Bernal directed and wrote his first film, Pagdating sa Dulo (At the Top), in 1971. In this film we catch a glimpse into what Ishmael Bernal's ouvre would prefigure for the industry: it is a scene showing an aspiring actress (played by Rita Gomez) pondering on dreams blooming in deserts of desolation and dying out in a mirage that painfully conjures images of squatter colonies and sordid lives. The bold star stares out into the landscape and scans it, with the camera acting as her surrogate, but finally framing her against the embarrassingly majestic Cultural Center of the Philippines. The scene captures it all: the decadence of the Martial Law regime, along with its perverse aspirations to art, has doomed the destinies of Filipinos. From that time on, Bernal was established as an innovative and intelligent filmmaker who would not be content with conventional formulas of local film making. Under his name is a broad range of film genres and themes: historical dramas like El Vibora (The Viper), and the Bonifacio episode in the unreleased Lahing Pilipino (The Filipino Race); sophisticated comedies like Tisoy (Mestizo), Pabling (Playboy), Working Girls I and Working Girls II; experimental films like Nunal sa Tubig (Speck in the Water) and Himala (Miracle); and contemporary dramas exploring human psyches and social relationships, such as Ligaw Na Bulaklak (Wildflower), Mister Mo, Lover Boy Ko (Your Husband, My Lover), Ikaw Ay Akin (You Are Mine), Relasyon (The Affair), Aliw (Pleasure) and the film classic Manila by Night (or City After Dark). His sturdy filmography is mainly clustered around the themes and problems that inevitably encrust the "social" as the core of personal malaise.

Bernal considered himself a feminist director and admitted that it was part of his interest to tackle issues affecting women. A significant part of his work is stories about and for women. For example, Relasyon, Hinugot sa Langit (1985), and Working Girls. Before Bernal died in Quezon City on June 2, 1996, he was scheduled to direct a film about the life story of Lola Rosa Henson, the comfort woman during the Japanese invasion of the Philippines.

In Philippine television
Aside from film, Bernal also directed television shows like the long-time drama series Ang Makulay Na Daigdig ni Nora (The Colorful World of Nora) for which he was named Outstanding Director in a Drama Series by the Patas Awards in 1979; Metro Magazine, Isip Pinoy, Dear Teacher and episodes for PETABISYON and Lorna. As an actor, he played lead roles in stage plays like Kamatayan Sa Isang Anyo Ng Rosas (Death in the Form of a Rose) in 1991 and Bacchae in 1992.

Activism 
Bernal had been an activist since university, when he was a member of the Student Cultural Association of the University of the Philippines. After graduation, he became involved in Kabataang Makabayan youth organization. He protested film censorship and was part of the Free the Artist movement and the Concerned Artists of the Philippines.

His films, including those he directed during the dictatorship of Ferdinand Marcos, were also known for bearing feminist and social realist themes.

Achievements
He won the Urian for best director four times for Dalawang Pugad, Isang Ibon (Two Nests, One Bird), 1977; Broken Marriage, 1983; Hinugot sa Langit (Wrenched From Heaven), 1985; and Pahiram Ng Isang Umaga (Lend Me One Morning), 1989; and the best screenplay for City After Dark, 1980. His film Pagdating sa Dulo, won for him the FAMAS for best screenplay award while Himala (Miracle), 1982, garnered nine major awards in the Metro Manila Film Festival. In that same year, Bernal was chosen by the Manunuri ng Pelikulang Pilipino as the Most Outstanding Filmmaker of the Decade 1971-1980. Among the 10 best films chosen by the critics, five were his. These include Pagdating sa Dulo, Nunal sa Tubig, Manila By Night, Himala and Hinugot sa Langit. He was also hailed as Director of the Decade by the Catholic Mass Media Awards (CMMA).

Bernal also won the CMMA Best Director Award (1983), the Bronze Hugo Award in the Chicago International Film Festival (1983) for the movie Himala. The Cultural Center of the Philippines presented him the Gawad CCP Para sa Sining for film in 1990. In 1993, he received the ASEAN Cultural Award in Communication Arts in Brunei Darrussalam.

In New York City
His Nunal sa Tubig (A Speck in the Water), Aliw (Pleasure) and Relasyon (The Affair) was among the 25 Filipino films shown in New York from July 31 to August 1999, organized by the Film Society of Lincoln Center, in partnership with the Philippine Centennial Commission, the Cultural Center of the Philippines, IFFCOM, the Philippine Information Agency, the Consulate General of the Philippines in New York and the Philippine Centennial Coordinating Council - Northeast USA. This series of Filipino films were presented at the Walter Reade Theater of the Lincoln Center, in celebration of the 100th year of Philippine Independence.

Death
He died on June 2, 1996, in Quezon City, Philippines of a heart attack.

Filmography

As director and writer

Television

Accolades

See also
Brocka-Bernal: Alaala ng mga Artista ng Bayan, December 1996

References

External links

1938 births
1996 deaths
Filipino feminists
Filipino film directors
Filipino television directors
Male feminists
National Artists of the Philippines
People from Manila
University of the Philippines Diliman alumni